Holloway Jingles is a collection of poetry written by a group of suffragettes who were imprisoned in Holloway jail during 1912. It was published by the Glasgow branch of the Women's Social and Political Union. The poems were collected and edited by Nancy A John, and smuggled out of the prison by John and Janet Barrowman. The foreword was written by Theresa Gough.

The cover depicts two drawings of a bare cell with a check pattern design. The publication was advertised for sale in the newspaper Votes for Women for a cost of 1 shilling. All proceeds of sales went to the W.S.P.U.

Poems
 "The Women in prison" by Kathleen Emerson
 "Oh, who are these in scant array", by Kathleen Emerson
 "To a fellow prisoner" (Miss Janie Allan), by anonymous, but thought to be Margaret McPhun
 "There was a small woman called G" by anonymous
 "There's a strange sort of college" by Edith Aubrey Wingrove
 "Before I came to Holloway" by Madeleine Caron Rock
 "Full tide" by AA Wilson
 "Who" by Kate Evans
 "The cleaners of Holloway" by Kate Evans
 "To D.R. in Holloway" by Joan Lavender Bailie Guthrie (Laura Grey) . Thought to be about Dorothea Rock
 "Holloway, 8th March" by A Martin
 "The beech wood saunters idly to the sea" by Katherine M Richmond
 "An end" by AA Wilson
 "L'Envoi" by Emily Davison
 "Newington butts were lively" by Alice Stewart Ker

See also

Feminism in the United Kingdom
List of suffragists and suffragettes
List of women's rights activists
List of women's rights organizations
Timeline of women's suffrage
Women's suffrage organizations

References

Poetry collections
Women's suffrage in the United Kingdom
Women's Social and Political Union
Scottish suffragists
Scottish suffragettes
1912 poems